Bolingbrook is a village in Will and DuPage counties in the U.S. state of Illinois. It is a southwest suburb of Chicago on I-55 and Historic Route 66 (Frontage Road). The village was a new town built on the Gateway Wetlands west of the Des Plaines River in the 1960s. Bolingbrook experienced rapid growth in the 1980s and 1990s, and eventually became the second largest town in the county after Joliet. Per the 2020 census, the population was 73,922. As of 2010, it is the 17th largest incorporated place in Illinois and the state's 2nd largest village.

Geography
Bolingbrook is approximately 28 miles southwest of Downtown Chicago.

Bolingbrook borders the communities of Woodridge, Romeoville, Plainfield, Naperville, and Darien.

Interstate 55, locally the Stevenson Expressway, runs through the southern part of the village heading northeast toward Chicago and southwest toward Plainfield and Joliet. Interstate 355, also known as the Veterans Memorial Tollway (formerly the North-South Tollway), runs along the far east side of the village between New Lenox and Addison. Illinois Route 53, locally known as Bolingbrook Drive, runs north–south through the middle of the village.

Other main streets in Bolingbrook include Boughton Road, Lily Cache Lane, Weber Road, Veterans Parkway (formerly Naperville Road), Briarcliff Road, Hassert Boulevard (formerly 111th Street), Rodeo Drive (formerly 119th Street), Schmidt Road, Crossroads Parkway, and Remington Boulevard.

Demographics
As of the 2020 census there were 73,922 people, 23,165 households, and 18,354 families residing in the village. The racial makeup of the village was 40.12% White, 19.49% African American, 0.89% Native American, 13.89% Asian, 0.02% Pacific Islander, 12.71% from other races, and 12.89% from two or more races. Hispanic or Latino of any race were 26.85% of the population.

There were 23,165 households, out of which 70.02% had children under the age of 18 living with them, 60.17% were married couples living together, 14.53% had a female householder with no husband present, and 20.77% were non-families. 16.40% of all households were made up of individuals, and 5.86% had someone living alone who was 65 years of age or older. The average household size was 3.62 and the average family size was 3.19.

The village's age distribution consisted of 25.6% under the age of 18, 10.3% from 18 to 24, 26.6% from 25 to 44, 26.5% from 45 to 64, and 10.8% who were 65 years of age or older. The median age was 36.6 years. For every 100 females, there were 96.9 males. For every 100 females age 18 and over, there were 94.6 males.

The median income for a household in the village was $92,184, and the median income for a family was $102,174. Males had a median income of $51,465 versus $37,208 for females. The per capita income for the village was $35,900. About 7.5% of families and 7.8% of the population were below the poverty line, including 13.4% of those under age 18 and 6.8% of those age 65 or over.

Note: the US Census treats Hispanic/Latino as an ethnic category. This table excludes Latinos from the racial categories and assigns them to a separate category. Hispanics/Latinos can be of any race.

History

Bolingbrook is a suburb of Chicago incorporated in 1965. Similar to the neighboring village of Woodridge, almost all of the businesses, homes, churches and other buildings in Bolingbrook were built after 1960. The first settlement in what is now Bolingbrook was established in 1831, but the informal farming villages remained unincorporated for over 130 years. The area that is now Bolingbrook is located in the heart of the Gateway Wetlands, which begin in Downers Grove and end just north of the Joliet city limits. The tiny Boardman Cemetery, in what is now the Heritage Creek subdivision, contains the remains of some of these early residents. 

Modern Bolingbrook has its roots in the housing boom of the 1950s. The first subdivision in Bolingbrook, known as Westbury, was immediately west of Route 53. A second subdivision, known as Colonial Village, followed on the far east side of Route 53.

The village continued to grow steadily for the remainder of the 1960s, reaching a population of 7,000 by 1970. The 1970s were the first period of rapid growth in Bolingbrook, during which its population quintupled to reach over 37,000 by 1980. Much of this growth was as much due to mass annexation as well as raw population growth; the population of Bolingbrook by the 1970 census but with its 1980 land boundary was approximately 25,000, further reflecting the vigorous annexation that took place during the 1970s.

By 1990, Bolingbrook's population had only increased by about 10% from the previous decade, to about 41,000.

Economy
As of 2019, 24 companies of various sizes have their corporate headquarters in Bolingbrook.  The largest being:  The nation-wide cosmetic retailer Ulta Beauty, as well as vehicle floor liner manufacturer WeatherTech.  Other corporate headquarters include:  ATI Physical Therapy, Stevenson Crane, American Chrome, Computer Projects of Illinois, Diageo, Diamond Technical Services, Epir Technologies, Goya Foods' Illinois division, Midwest Fuel & Injection, G & W Electric, Illinois Paper & Copier, Jet Brite car washes, Wi-Tronix, Perkins Manufacturing, Vision Integrated Graphics, Clark Foam Products, Wastebuilt, COTG - Chicago Office Technology Group, and Windy City Wire.

Top employers
According to the Bolingbrook Park District's 2017 Comprehensive Annual Financial Report, the top employers in the village are:

Government
John J. "Jack" Leonard was instrumental in the village's incorporation and served as the village's first mayor.

In 1971, Bolingbrook purchased station 2 from the Lemont Fire Protection District, which had been serving much of the village, thus establishing its own fire department. Since then, that station has been expanded and four others have been built.

As of August 2020, the acting mayor of Bolingbrook is Mary Alexander-Basta. On July 31, 2020, longtime mayor Roger C. Claar resigned, having served in the role since 1986; Village Trustee Basta was unanimously appointed by the village board to complete Claar's term.

Major highways
Major highways in Bolingbrook include:

Interstate Highways
 Interstate 55
 Interstate 355

US Highways
 Historic US 66

Illinois Highways
 Route 53
 Route 126

Education
Most of Bolingbrook lies within the boundaries of Valley View School District 365U and Fountaindale Public Library District, both of which also include nearby Romeoville, Illinois. Other school districts that serve Bolingbrook include Plainfield School District 202, Indian Prairie School District 204, Naperville School District 203, Woodridge School District 68, and Downers Grove High School District 99.

Early history
School District 365U was originally known as District 94.  It took its present name when it became the first school district in the United States to implement the 45-15 plan, in which schools were occupied year round with 3/4 of the students in session at any one time.  Students went to school for 9 weeks and then had 3 weeks off. Additionally, teachers were optionally allowed to work year-round.

The first school built in Bolingbrook was North View School at 151 E. Briarcliff Rd., Bolingbrook, IL (now closed).

High schools
Bolingbrook High School (365U), Plainfield North and Plainfield East (202), Neuqua Valley High School (204), Naperville Central (203), and Downers Grove South (99). Romeoville High School also serves as an alternative for some students residing in Valley View 365U.

Middle schools
In Valley View 365U
Brooks (in the former Bolingbrook High School building and home of the district's ESL program)
Jane Addams (near the Bolingbrook Recreation and Aquatic Center)
Hubert H. Humphrey

In Indian Prairie 204 (Naperville)
Gregory

In Naperville CUSD 203
Madison

In Plainfield Community Consolidated School District 202
Kennedy (Plainfield)

In Woodridge Elementary School District 68
Jefferson (Woodridge).

Elementary schools
In Valley View 365U
Bernard J. Ward (formerly a middle school)
Independence
Jamie McGee
John R. Tibbott
Jonas E. Salk
Pioneer
Oak View
Wood View

In Indian Prairie 204
Builta

In Naperville 203
River Woods

In Plainfield Community Consolidated School District 202 
Liberty
Elizabeth Eichelberger

In Woodridge Elementary School District 68
John L. Sipley
William F. Murphy

Alternative schools
In Valley View 365U
STEP Program (also housed in the former Bolingbrook High School building)

Private schools
Catholic schools:
St. Dominic School (serving grades PK - 8)
Parochial grade school students may go on to Catholic high schools in proximity to Bolingbrook such as Benet Academy in Lisle, Joliet Catholic Academy in Joliet, and (until its closure in 2014) the all-girls Mount Assisi Academy in Lemont.

Islamic schools:
Furqaan Academy (PK-12)

Parks and recreation

Bolingbrook Park District
The Bolingbrook Park District was created in 1970, after being approved by referendum. In 1974, the Park District built its first new building, the Deatherage-Drdak Center, constructed only with volunteer labor. In the following three decades the Bolingbrook Park District has grown to include numerous woodlands and parks, several community centers, the Pelican Harbor Indoor/Outdoor Aquatic Complex, and the Bolingbrook Recreation and Aquatic Complex (BRAC). Most recently, the Bolingbrook Park District was one of the four finalists for the National Gold Medal Award for Excellence in Park Management, Facilities and Programs.

In 1982, the Park District opened the first indoor wave pool in the United States. It was closed shortly after the BRAC and Pelican Harbor opened in 1996, and has since been converted to an ice skating arena.

In 2009, the Park District opened its Hidden Oaks Nature Center, which sits on 80 acres of woodland and river plain habitat. The Nature Center has a Platinum LEED Rating from the U.S. Green Building Council and was built from recycled materials. As of 2014, the Nature Center is used to run naturalist programs and summer camps. Animal residents include: coyotes, deer, great horned owls, and other species common to Northern Illinois.

Golf
Bolingbrook is home to the Boughton Ridge Golf Course, a 9-hole course owned by the Bolingbrook Park District. In addition, the Bolingbrook Golf Club, a municipal facility which includes an 18-hole course, is in the village. Other Golf Courses within proximity of Bolingbrook include Naperbrook GC, Tamarack GC, Wedgewood GC, and Links at Carillon (all in Plainfield), White Eagle GC and Springbrook GC in Naperville, Village Greens of Woodridge and Seven Bridges GC in Woodridge,  Cog Hill GC in Lemont, and Mistwood GC in Romeoville.

Aviation
Clow International Airport is a small airport off of Boughton-Weber with an estimated  runway. Clow is a public (non-commercial) airport, owned by the Village and operated under a contract with a management company. In 1989, the airport was named the "best privately owned, public use airport in Illinois." Currently, there are 70,000 take-offs and landings at the airport annually.

A WGN-TV helicopter is stationed at Clow Airport. The airport previously served as a base station for Air Angels Aeromedical Transport before the company closed its doors in early 2009. It also provides flight training and airplane charters through A & M Aviation, aircraft maintenance through A & M Maintenance, and has an EAA chapter that provides free Young Eagles flights for children.

The Illinois Aviation Museum at Bolingbrook was formed in 2004. The museum is staffed by volunteers and is in a remodeled hangar at Clow International Airport, currently donated by the Village of Bolingbrook.

Notable people 

 Mustafa Ali, WWE wrestler born in Bolingbrook
 Kenneth Boatright, football free agent raised in Bolingbrook
 Ronnie Bull, retired Bears running back who currently lives in Bolingbrook
 Troy Doris, Olympian finalist triple jumper
 J. J. Furmaniak, professional baseball infielder raised in Bolingbrook
 Jerry Harris, cheerleader from Cheer (TV series) raised in Bolingbrook
 Anthony Herron, former professional American football player and now broadcast analyst
Ben Moore (born 1995), basketball player in the Israeli Basketball Premier League
 Michael S. Pearson, Fort Hood 2009 victim raised in Bolingbrook
 Drew Peterson, former Bolingbrook police sergeant, suspected in the disappearance of his fourth wife, convicted of drowning his third wife
 Steve Williams, football free agent raised in Bolingbrook

Sister cities
  San Pablo City, Laguna, Philippines
  Sialkot, Punjab, Pakistan
  Xuchang, Henan, China

See also

 The Promenade Bolingbrook
Bolingbrook High School
Bolingbrook's Clow International Airport

References

External links
Village website
Clow Airport
Illinois Aviation Museum
website of the Bolingbrook Park District
Fountaindale Public Library

 
Populated places established in 1965
Chicago metropolitan area
Villages in DuPage County, Illinois
Villages in Will County, Illinois
Villages in Illinois
1965 establishments in Illinois
Majority-minority cities and towns in DuPage County, Illinois
Majority-minority cities and towns in Will County, Illinois